Sébastien Simon (born 6 May 1990) is a French professional offshore sailor.

Background
Throughout his youth he sailed finishing 3rd in the 2013 420 Class World Championship he moved onto the French Offshore scene winning the Solitaire du Figaro in 2018, he participates in the Vendée Globe in 2020 on the Imoca 60 Arkea-Paprec where it retired due to foil damage

Career highlinght

References

External links
 
 
 Team Paprec Arkéa - Site Officiel 

1990 births
Living people
French male sailors (sport)
420 class sailors
IMOCA 60 class sailors
French Vendee Globe sailors
2020 Vendee Globe sailors